Alexander McLaren (25 December 1910 – 5 February 1960) was a Scottish footballer, who played as a goalkeeper.

Born in Tibbermore, Perthshire, McLaren played club football for St Johnstone in the Scottish Football League and Leicester City in The Football League.

He earned five caps for Scotland in 1929 and 1932, and remains St Johnstone's most capped player for Scotland, as well as the joint-first to debut (Willie Imrie played in the same match – they were the only serving players from the club to be selected until Murray Davidson in 2012). McLaren was one of only four 18-year-olds to play for Scotland during the 20th century, the others being Denis Law, Paul McStay and Willie Henderson. He remains the youngest goalkeeper to play for Scotland, as he made his debut aged 18 years and 152 days.

References

Sources

External links

London Hearts
FilbertStreet.net profile

1910 births
1960 deaths
Footballers from Perth and Kinross
Scottish footballers
Association football goalkeepers
Scotland international footballers
St Johnstone F.C. players
Leicester City F.C. players
Airdrieonians F.C. (1878) wartime guest players
Greenock Morton F.C. wartime guest players
St Johnstone F.C. wartime guest players
Scottish Football League players
English Football League players